Ma Yugui (born 4 March 1995) is a Chinese athlete. She competed in the women's marathon event at the 2019 World Athletics Championships.

References

External links

1995 births
Living people
Chinese female long-distance runners
Chinese female marathon runners
Place of birth missing (living people)
World Athletics Championships athletes for China